African Distillers is a company in Zimbabwe. It is one of the largest producers of alcoholic beverages, primarily distilled spirits and wines, in Zimbabwe.

History
The company was founded in 1944 as "P J Joubert Limited", a wine import firm and then purchased a distillery in Mutare in 1946 and began manufacturing beverages in its own right. In 1974, African Distillers moved its headquarters to Stapleford. It was estimated in 1989 that African Distillers produced about 3 million bottles of wine a year, three-quarters of the country's total domestic wine industry. The company's wine production is located at the Green Valley vineyards in Odzi.

Operations
In Zimbabwe, African Distillers maintains 6 supply depots, at Bulawayo, Harare, Kwekwe, Masvingo, Mutare and Victoria Falls.  African Distillers operates 3 cash and carry outlet stores, at Harare, Mutare and Bulawayo.

The company's products include

Spirit portfolio

Wine portfolio

Ownership 
The stock of African Distillers listed on the Zimbabwe Stock Exchange, where it trades under the symbol AFDS and is part of the Zimbabwe Industrial Index.

1→Afdis Holdings is an investment holding company owned by Delta Corporation and Distell Group. Based on direct and indirect shareholding in African Distillers, Delta Corporation and Distell Group's effective control of the company is 50.44% and 30.04% respectively.

See also 

 Delta Corporation
 Distell Group Limited

References

Companies listed on the Zimbabwe Stock Exchange
Food and drink companies of Zimbabwe
Distilleries
Mutare District
1944 establishments in Southern Rhodesia